Niv Libner (born 11 January 1987) is an Israeli former professional cyclist, who last rode for the  team. Born in Tel Aviv, Libner started bicycling at the age of 11, and in 2005 won the Israeli National Junior Road Race Championships and in 2010, the Israeli National Road Race Championships. In 2011 he was the third ever Israeli to join a Pro Cycling Team, by joining .

Major results

2005
 National Junior Road Championships
1st  Road race
2nd Time trial
2006
 1st Volvo Challenge XC Marton Race
 2nd Harish Road Race
 2nd XC Marton of Mitzpe-Ramon
2008
 1st Overall Tour d'Arad
1st Stages 1 (TTT) & 2
 1st Neot Qedumim
 1st Harish Road Race
 1st Qiriat–Shmona–Yehodia
2009
 1st Overall Apple Tour
1st Stages 1, 2 (ITT) & 3
 1st Magenim Forst
 1st Harish Race
 Maccabiah Games
3rd Road race
6th Individual time trial
 3rd Road race, National Road Championships
2010
 1st  Road race, National Road Championships
 1st Overall Tour de Israel (with Ran Margaliot)
1st Stages 1, 2, 3 & 4
2011
 National Road Championships
1st  Road race
3rd Time trial
2013
 2nd Hets Hatsafon
2014
 1st  Road race, National Road Championships
 3rd Hets Hatsafon

References

External links
 biciciclismo.com
 cyclingarchives.com

Israeli male cyclists
Tour de Guadeloupe cyclists
Living people
1987 births
Sportspeople from Tel Aviv
Maccabiah Games bronze medalists for Israel